Yosef (Yosi) Havilio (He: יוסי חביליו) is an Israeli lawyer and politician who currently serves as a Deputy Mayor for Jerusalem. Havilio served as the Head Legal Advisor and Attorney General for Jerusalem, is a community activist and is a recipient of the Knight of Quality Award.

Personal Life and Education 
Havilio was born in 1959 in Jerusalem, Israel, and grew up in the Rasko neighborhood where he attended the Jerusalem Rehavia Gymnasium. He played competitive sports with the Hapoel Jerusalem Youth Basketball team and as a track runner. Havilio won the gold medal in the 400m hurdles at the Israel Athletics Championships in 1976. 
In 1977, he was drafted to the Israeli Defense Forces and served as an Aerial Explorer in the Intelligence Corps. 
After his military service, Havilio attended the Hebrew University of Jerusalem where he received a Bachelor of Arts degree in Law and a Master of Arts degree in Public Policy, Public Administration, and Law, graduating with honors.
Havilio is married to Liora Havilio, who serves as the Tel Aviv District Attorney. Together they have three children and live in the Ramat Sharet neighborhood in Jerusalem.

Career 
After university, Havilio worked as an intern for Yitzhak Zamir at the Office of the Attorney General. Soon after in 1985, Havilio opened a private law firm that focused on civil and commercial law.

Legal Advisor for Jerusalem
In 2001, Havilio was appointed to be the Legal Advisor and Attorney General of Jerusalem. In this position, Havilio gave legal counsel to the Municipality and worked as the lead public prosecutor. During his tenure, Havilio confronted mayors Uri Lupolianski and Nir Barkat on many principal issues. Havilio gave legal opinions that supported the Pride Parade in Jerusalem and to the Jerusalem Open House which was in major contrast to the mayor's position.
In 2011, Havilio left his position at the Jerusalem Municipality, for reasons related to his relationship with Mayor Nir Barkat.

Law Firm
In 2012, Havilio opened a private law firm that focused on public law and in offering legal advice to local councils and public committees. Havilio offered his services pro bono as a legal advisor to various organizations and to represent public petitioners in the Supreme Court. 
In one of his cases, Havilio petitioned the Supreme Court to allow the Cinema City complex in Jerusalem to stay open on Shabbat and Jewish holidays. He also petitioned the court to prevent the liquidation of the public housing company Parezot. From this petition, it was determined that the 130 million Shekels that were in the Perezot fund would be used to purchase apartments for those entitled to public housing in Jerusalem.
Havilio also petitioned the court to allow the opening of the Hamifletzet Pub, a community pub in Kiryat HaYoval that was closed by the municipality because it operated on Shabbat. After his petition, the pub was allowed to reopen and continues to operate today.

Community Activism
In 2014, Havilio founded Tzahor, an organization that works to promote the principles of equality, social and legal justice, human rights, and proper governance in Jerusalem. The organization conducted several high-profile campaigns against the Jerusalem Municipality about how government money was being used for personal political advancements.

Campaign for Mayor and Council
In 2017, Havilio announced that he was running for mayor of Jerusalem and launched the campaign slogan: "Havilio. Saving Jerusalem". In September 2018, he dropped out of the mayoral race and endorsed Ofer Berkowitz[6]. In the 2018 municipal council elections, his party won 4% of the vote and received one seat on the Jerusalem City Council.

Deputy Mayor
After the election, Havilio joined Mayor Moshe Leon's coalition and was selected to be a Deputy Mayor for a half term. Since beginning his term in July, Havilio has focused his efforts on local environmental causes, increasing women's representation, simulating community co-ops and on addressing the needs of the Arab population. In addition, Havilio's main focus is to represent and voice of the Secular and Traditional community in the very Orthodox and Haredi dominated Municipality.

Knight of the Quality of Government Award 
In 2010, Havilio won the Knight of the Quality of Government Award for his struggle for just governance. Judge Mishael Cheshin awarded Havilio saying:
"Havilio's willingness to fight against powerful politicians, and endangering his job in order to prevent harm to our foundational institutions, should  serve as the example for all public servants."

References

1959 births
Living people
20th-century Israeli lawyers
21st-century Israeli lawyers
Deputy Mayors of Jerusalem
Hebrew University of Jerusalem Faculty of Law alumni
Israeli male hurdlers
Israeli politicians
Lawyers from Jerusalem